Nawab Sir Shahnawaz Khan Mamdot (17 December 1883 – 28 March 1942) was a Punjabi landowner and politician of British India. He was a key supporter of the Pakistan movement and for some time, the largest landowner in undivided Punjab.

Early life and career
He was born in Mamdot, Kasur District, Punjab in 1883. In 1907, he left Punjab, British India and settled in Hyderabad State where he joined the state police. In 1928, Nawab Ghulam Qutbuddin Khan Mamdot, ruler on the Mamdot estate at that time, died without issue and childless, and the British Court of Law awarded Shahnawaz the jagirs and title of Nawab of Mamdot. In doing so, he became one of the largest landowners in the Punjab. 

He returned to his ancestral land in 1934 and joined the Unionist Party (Punjab). Following the Jinnah-Sikandar Pact in 1937, Mamdot joined the All-India Muslim League and became President of the Punjab Muslim League in 1938. Then he became head of it and started structurally reorganisinig the Punjab Muslim League. He then played a key role in organizing the historic session of the All-India Muslim League in March 1940 in Lahore. He personally paid almost all its expenses. He also was the chairman of the reception committee. Jinnah usually stayed at his 'Mamdot Villa' whenever he was in Lahore.

He was knighted in the King's New Year's Honour List at the start of 1939. Later that year, he funded publication of a book by Mian Kifait Ali titled "Pakistan", which caused Mohammad Ali Jinnah to intervene and insist on a name change before publication for risk of antagonizing non-Muslims. 

Mamdot was a staunch supporter of a separate Muslim nation, and held the belief that Muslims could never tolerate subjugation to a community with which they shared no common ground in religion, culture and civilisation. 

At the Lahore Resolution session in 1940, he gave the welcome address as chairman of the local reception committee.

Commemorative postage stamp
Pakistan Post issued a commemorative postage stamp in his honor in 1990.

Death and legacy
He died of a heart attack in Lahore on 28 March 1942. 

He was succeeded as the Nawab of Mamdot, and president of the Punjab Muslim League by his son Iftikhar Hussain Khan Mamdot.

References 

1883 births
1942 deaths
History of Punjab
Indian landowners
People from British India
Indian Knights Bachelor
Mamdot family
20th-century landowners
Pakistan Movement activists